Jane Greer (born 1953) is an American poet. She founded Plains Poetry Journal, a quarterly literary magazine that was an advance guard of the New Formalism movement, in 1981, and edited it until 1993. Her poetry collections include Bathsheba on the Third Day (1986) and Love like a Conflagration (2020).

Plains Poetry Journal
In 1981, Greer founded Plains Poetry Journal, a quarterly literary magazine that was an advance guard of the New Formalism movement. In her "Editorial Manifesto," Greer wrote: "Through history, the best poetry has used certain conventions: meter, rhyme, alliteration, assonance, painstaking attention to diction. Not all good poems use all of these conventions, but if a poem uses none of them, why call it a poem?" She decried the sort of conversational free verse "that reads like random thoughts randomly written," and wrote, "All these attempts at unfettered individuality sound alike." In 1984, Writer's Digest named Plains Poetry Journal the "#1 Non-paying U.S. Poetry Magazine." Greer edited Plains Poetry Journal until 1993.

1980s–1990s
In the 1980s and early 1990s, Greer's poems appeared in the anthologies A Formal Feeling Comes, edited by Annie Finch, and A Garland for Harry Duncan, edited by W. Thomas Taylor, and in many journals, including Yale Literary Magazine, First Things, America, and Chronicles. For Chronicles she also wrote the monthly "Letters from the Heartland" column. Her ideas about poetics and esthetics are elaborated in a short essay, "Art Is Made," in A Formal Feeling Comes.

Bathsheba on the Third Day (1986)
In 1986, Greer's first poetry collection, Bathsheba on the Third Day, was released in a limited hardcover edition of three hundred copies hand-typeset and hand-printed by Harry Duncan at The Cummington Press.

Return to publication
After nearly three decades working as a civil servant for the State of North Dakota, teaching writing at Bismarck State College, and working in advertising and marketing, Greer returned in 2019 to writing poetry and being published in major journals, including National Review, Modern Age, First Things, St. Austin Review, The North American Anglican, and Angelus. She has been featured in several podcasts, and writes reviews for publications such as Literary Matters and Angelus.

Love like a Conflagration (2020)
Greer's second poetry collection, Love like a Conflagration, was published in May 2020 by Lambing Press (Pittsburgh, Pennsylvania). The collection of new poems also included a reissue of Bathsheba on the Third Day, and received strong advance endorsements from Samuel John Hazo, James Matthew Wilson, Anthony Esolen, Ryan Wilson, C. C. Pecknold, A. M. Juster, and Jennifer Reeser.

Bibliography
 Love like a Conflagration, Lambing Press, Pittsburgh, Pa. 2020
 Bathsheba on the Third Day, The Cummington Press, University of Nebraska, Omaha, Neb. 1986.
 Greer, Jane. "Rodin's 'Gates of Hell,'" A Formal Feeling Comes: Poems in Form by Contemporary Women, Annie Finch, Ed., Story Line Press, Brownsville, Ore., 1994. pp. 79–80.
 Greer, Jane. "Professor Dobbs to Jayleen Nichols on Semantics and the Fact of Myth," A Garland for Harry Duncan, W. Thomas Taylor, Ed., W. Thomas Taylor Press, Austin, Texas, 1989. pp. 37–38.

References

Living people
Formalist poets
1953 births
American women poets
21st-century American women writers